Alexander Campbell (1876 – May 16, 1940) was a physician, fox rancher and political figure in Newfoundland. He represented St. John's in the Newfoundland and Labrador House of Assembly from 1928 to 1932.

He was born on Prince Edward Island, educated at Prince of Wales College, McGill University, the Royal College of Physicians of Edinburgh and the University of Vienna. Campbell came to Newfoundland in 1902 and set up practice in Bonne Bay. He moved to St. John's two years later. He ran unsuccessfully as a Liberal Reform Party candidate for a seat in the Newfoundland assembly in 1919. Campbell was named to the Executive Council as Minister of Agriculture and Mines and became a member of the Legislative Council of Newfoundland in 1920. He was accused of misspending government funds and a later investigation found that there was some truth to these accusations. When Richard Squires refused to remove Campbell from cabinet in 1923, Squires was forced to resign as Prime Minister. Despite this, Campbell was elected to the Newfoundland assembly in 1928 and was named a minister without portfolio in the Executive Council. Campbell died in St. John's in 1940.

References 
 

Members of the Newfoundland and Labrador House of Assembly
Members of the Legislative Council of Newfoundland
1876 births
1940 deaths
McGill University alumni
Canadian emigrants to pre-Confederation Newfoundland
Government ministers of the Dominion of Newfoundland